Danilo "Dane" Stojanović (1904–18) was a Serbian Chetnik commander in Old Serbia and Macedonia (1904–08), who also participated in the Balkan Wars (1912–13). He was also known as Dane Krapče.

Life
Stojanović was born in Krapa, a village in the Makedonski Brod municipality, at the time part of the Prilep kaza of the Ottoman Empire (now Makedonski Brod, R. Macedonia). He joined the cheta (band) of Gligor Sokolović. Upon the murder of Sokolović by Turks on July 30, 1910, Stojanović succeeded as the band's commander. He participated in the Balkan Wars. In the First Balkan War, he was at the front of the Chetnik detachments and fought at Kumanovo and Bitola.

See also
 List of Chetnik voivodes
Trenko Rujanović
Tasa Konević

Sources

20th-century Serbian people
Serbian rebels
Serbian military personnel of the Balkan Wars
People from Makedonski Brod Municipality